Ilex colchica, commonly known as Colchic- or Black Sea holly, is a species of holly native to Bulgaria, Turkey and the Caucasus.

The specific epithet colchica, referring to Colchis, an ancient kingdom and region on the coast of the Black Sea centered in present-day western Georgia.

References

colchica
Flora of Bulgaria
Flora of Georgia (country)
Flora of Turkey